This article documents the chronology of the response to the COVID-19 pandemic in June 2022, which originated in Wuhan, China in December 2019. Some developments may become known or fully understood only in retrospect. Reporting on this pandemic began in December 2019.

Reactions and measures in the United Nations

Reactions and measures in Africa

Reactions and measures in the Americas

8 June
Ontario lifts mask requirements for hospitals and public transportation, commencing 11 June.

17 June
The United States Food and Drug Administration authorizes the use of the Moderna COVID-19 vaccine for children between the ages of six months and 17 years, and the Pfizer-BioNTech COVID-19 vaccine for children between the ages of six months and four years.

Reactions and measures in the Eastern Mediterranean

Reactions and measures in Europe

Reactions and measures in South, East and Southeast Asia

18 June
Malaysia and India have agreed to recognise each others' COVID-19 vaccination certificates.

Reactions and measures in the Western Pacific

16 June
New Zealand's Covid-19 Response Minister Dr. Ayesha Verrall has announced that pre-departure COVID-19 test requirements for all travellers entering or transiting through the country would be lifted from 20 June 2022 onwards.

28 June
New Zealand's COVID-19 Response Minister Dr. Verrall announced that the COVID-19 vaccine mandate for Corrections and border workers would be lifted on 2 July 2022.

30 June
Dr. Verall confirmed that New Zealand would remain at the orange setting of the COVID-19 "traffic light" system due to rising case numbers.

See also 

 Timeline of the COVID-19 pandemic in June 2022
 Responses to the COVID-19 pandemic

References 

June 2022 events
Timelines of the COVID-19 pandemic in 2022
Responses to the COVID-19 pandemic in 2022